Elections to Falkirk Council were held on 3 May 2007—the same day as the Scottish Parliament general election. The election was the first one using 9 new wards created as a result of the Local Governance (Scotland) Act 2004. Each ward will elect three or four councillors using the single transferable vote system form of proportional representation. The new wards replace 32 single-member wards which used the plurality (first past the post) system of election.

Results

Ward results

2007-2011 by-elections 
Following the death of SNP Cllr Harry Constable, a by-election arose and the seat was retained by the party's Ann Ritchie on 1 November 2009.

Following the death of SNP Cllr John Constable, a by-election arose and the seat was retained by the party's Sandy Turner on 10 June 2011.

References

External links 
 Falkirk Council Results Page

2007
2007 Scottish local elections